Magnus Berge (February 16, 1909 – March 29, 2001) was the lead on the Åredalens CK curling team (from Åre, Sweden) during the World Curling Championships (known as the Scotch Cup) 1963 and 1964. In 1966 he was inducted into the Swedish Curling Hall of Fame.

References

External links
 

Swedish male curlers
Swedish curling champions
1909 births
2001 deaths